Lvov is the name of a princely Russian family of Rurikid stock. The family is descended from the princes of Yaroslavl where early members of the family are buried.

Notable members
Knyaz Matvey Danilovich (?–1603), Voivod in Tobolsk (1592) and in Verkhoturye (1601)
Knyaz Ivan Dimitriyevich, Voivod in Tyumen (1635–1639)
Knyaz Alexey Mikhaylovich (?–1653), Stolnik (1613), Okolnichiy (1627–), Boyar (1635) and head of the 'Prikaz of the Great Palace' (that is, a court marshal)
Knyaz Dmitry Petrovich (?–1660), Boyar (1655)
Knyaz Nikita Yakovlevich (?–1670), Okolnichiy and head of the Yamskoy Prikaz (the earliest version of the Russian Post Office)
Knyaz Mikhail Nikitich (?–1692), Boyar (1692)
Knyaz Vladimir Vladimirovich (1834–1865), Writer
Knyaz Georgy Yevgenyevich (1861–1925) (32nd generation Rurikid), Russian Prime Minister
Knyaz Alexander Dimitriyevich (1863–?), Fire-Brigade founder, Petergof Zemstvo chairman, cousin of Georgy Yevgenyevich

See also
Lvov dvoryan families

External links
About the family 

Lvov family